Miyagawa Dam  is a gravity dam located in Mie Prefecture in Japan. The dam is used for flood control and power production. The catchment area of the dam is 125.6 km2. The dam impounds about 200  ha of land when full and can store 70500 thousand cubic meters of water. The construction of the dam was started on 1951 and completed in 1956.

See also
List of dams in Japan

References

Dams in Mie Prefecture